Mariana Pérez Roldán (born 7 November 1967) is an Argentine former professional tennis player.

She won the French Open girls' doubles championship and ITF World girls' doubles championship in 1985 with Patricia Tarabini.

During her career, she did not win any titles on the WTA Tour, but won four ITF titles, including three women's doubles.

Junior Grand Slam finals

Girls' doubles (1–1)

WTA career finals

Singles: 1 (runner-up)

ITF finals

Singles (1–3)

Doubles (3–4)

External links
 
 
 Pérez Roldán, Academia de Tenis

Sources

Argentine female tennis players
1967 births
Living people
French Open junior champions
Grand Slam (tennis) champions in girls' doubles
South American Games gold medalists for Argentina
South American Games medalists in tennis
Competitors at the 1982 Southern Cross Games
People from Tandil
Sportspeople from Buenos Aires Province
20th-century Argentine women